Belarus competed at the 2012 Winter Youth Olympics in Innsbruck, Austria. The Belarusian team consisted of 16 athletes in 7 sports.

Medalists

Medals awarded to participants of mixed-NOC (combined) teams are represented in italics. These medals are not counted towards the individual NOC medal tally.

Alpine skiing

Belarus qualified one girl.

Girl

Biathlon

Belarus qualified a full team of two boys and girls.

Boy

Girl

Mixed

Cross country skiing

Belarus qualified one boy and girl.

Boy

Girl

Sprint

Mixed

Figure skating

Belarus qualified an ice dance pair

Mixed

Ice hockey

Belarus boy one girl to compete in the skills challenge competition.

Boy

Nordic combined 

Belarus qualified one boy.

Boy

Ski jumping

Belarus qualified one boy.

Boy

Speed skating

Belarus qualified a full team of two boys and girls.

Boy

Girl

See also
Belarus at the 2012 Summer Olympics

References

2012 in Belarusian sport
Nations at the 2012 Winter Youth Olympics
Belarus at the Youth Olympics